Jim Hansen (born January 24, 1947) is an American politician. He is a member of the Missouri House of Representatives, having served since 2013. He is a member of the Republican party.

Electoral history

State Representative

References

Living people
Republican Party members of the Missouri House of Representatives
1947 births
21st-century American politicians